Gustave Reininger (December 15, 1950 – April 19, 2012) was an American scriptwriter who was the co-creator of the NBC TV drama, Crime Story. The executive producer was Michael Mann. Crime Story was based on the Mafia in Chicago, or "The Outfit," and how it got off the streets and into the boardrooms of Las Vegas casinos. The show premiered with a two-hour pilot movie, which had been exhibited theatrically, and was watched by over 30 million viewers. Crime Story then was scheduled to follow Miami Vice on Friday nights and continued to attract a record number of viewers.

Reininger was a former Wall Street international investment banker who had come to Mann's attention based on a screenplay he had written about arson investigators, and a French language thriller with Dennis Hopper that he had co-written and produced. Mann's agent somehow reached Reininger while he was traveling incognito in the Mayan Highlands of Guatemala, with a liberation theology Catholic bishop.

Reininger researched Crime Story by winning the confidence of Detective William Hanhardt who put him in touch with undercover officers in the Chicago Police Department. They sent him on meetings with organized crime figures. Reininger risked wearing a body microphone and recorder. After visiting the crime scene of a gruesome gang slaying of bookmaker Al Brown, Reininger backed off his Mafia interviews.

In a June 1986 press conference, Mann said that the first season of the show would go from Chicago in 1963 to Las Vegas in 1980. He said, "It's a serial in the sense that we have continuing stories, and in that sense the show is one big novel." Mann and Reininger's inspiration for the 1963-1980 arc came from their mutual admiration of the 15½ hour television film, Berlin Alexanderplatz, by German director Rainer Werner Fassbinder'. Mann said, "The pace of our story is like the speed of light compared to that, but that's the idea - if you put it all together at the end you've got one hell of a 22-hour movie."

NBC chief Brandon Tartikoff allowed the series to move to Las Vegas for the last quarter of the 22 episodes. The last episode is legendary as Ray Luca and Pauli Taglia are on the lam, hiding from Det. Mike Torello, in a Nevada desert shack, which is located in an atomic bomb test area. An A-Bomb explodes, presumably obliterating Luca and Taglia, in one of the most memorable cliffhangers in television history, leaving viewers wondering whether they were dead or alive, just as the show's creator were wondering if the series itself was dead or alive with NBC. Viewers were surprised to learn in the fall the series had returned to be permanently based in Las Vegas.

The principal characters are based on the real-life head of the Chicago anti-mob unit, Det. William Hanhardt and on Chicago mobster Anthony Spilotro.

Reininger was subpoenaed to Spilotro's trial in Federal Court in Las Vegas as an unwilling material witness for Spilotro, who was alleging that the only way Reininger could have written scripts and the series "Bible" was by having access to Federal wiretaps of Spilotro. Reininger in turn discovered that his New York phones were being monitored. Reininger was served Spilotro's subpoena, and given a deadly warning, in a New York hotel bar by now infamous Hollywood private detective Anthony Pellicano, who in 2006 was imprisoned for illegal wiretapping, blackmail and harassment while representing notable entertainment figures.

Spilotro returned home to Chicago and was brutally murdered along with his brother Michael, and buried in an Indiana cornfield. The case was dismissed, and Reininger, who had sent all his Crime Story work materials to a former banking associate in Zurich, Switzerland, did not have to testify.

Subsequently, Martin Scorsese directed and produced his movie Casino loosely basing it on elements of Crime Story, which was recognized at the Casino premiere as an inspiration. Crime Story was the prototypes for today's arc-driven television series, such as 24 and The Sopranos that have continuing story lines over multiple episodes.

Recent work
Reininger was the director-producer of this feature documentary Corso: The Last Beat, which was released in 2009.

“Corso – The Last Beat” - Synopsis

The “Beats” are back. Ever “cool”, ever “hip”, this poignant, humorous film will introduce today’s youth market to the inner circle of the American Icons known as “the Beat Generation” – Kerouac, Ginsberg, Burroughs and Gregory Corso. It dove-tails with the new wave of interest in this 50th anniversary of “On the Road” and Francis Coppola’s upcoming film version... “The Last Beat” looks at the extraordinary life of Gregory Corso, the most colorful of “the Beats”… Outstanding documentary work combine with pacing and entertainment value that come from the film-maker’s background: Co-creator of NBC's and Michael Mann's “Crime Story” and "Miami Vice" contributor… By following Corso, the film shows how “the Beats” changed American society, paving the way for youth culture, the sexual revolution and even hip-hop… The film follows Gregory Corso on a trip to the monuments of France, Italy, and Greece retracing the early days of "The Beats."... Remarkably, the film-maker found Corso's Italian mother who abandoned him as a baby; reunited them; and caught these poignant moments on film… Corso also amazes by visiting prison inmates at Clinton State Prison, where at age 17 he was encouraged by Italian mafia prisoners to educate himself. (He ended up at Harvard later.)… After the European odyssey, a revitalized Corso returns to Greenwich Village to work again... Then, in ultimate irony, Corso faces his own mortality with humor and pluck, comforted by Ethan Hawke, Patti Smith and his newfound mother, Michellina.

Background
Reininger graduated from St. Xavier High School in Cincinnati. He graduated from University of Chicago, studying Economics and English literature. His prose was published in college literary magazines.

Reininger was an International Investment Banker with Chemical – Chase Bank, (now JP Morgan Chase.) He was on a management team supervising offshore banks, in a partnership venture with the Earl of Suffolk, John Scott-Ellis, the 9th Baron Howard de Walden. Reininger supervised banks based in Guernsey, Channel Islands; Beirut, Lebanon; Nassau, Bahamas; and Monrovia, Liberia.

At night, Reininger re-wrote scripts at, for producer Howard Zucker. Among them, Francis Coppola's 5th Coin, a script on Macau’s Formula One race,.

While working in Paris on a bank assignment Reininger co-produced a French Language thriller starring Dennis Hopper, Last In – First Out. The film also starred Bruno Cremer (Friedkin’s Sorcerer), Henri Serre (Jules et Jim) and Joseph Cotten (Citizen Kane.)

Reininger then migrated to working at Warner Brothers with partner Luis Sanjurjo. In addition to co-creating Crime Story, Reininger was a contributor to Michael Mann's Miami Vice and Robbery Homicide Division. Reininger has worked with directors Sydney Pollack, Penny Marshall, Paul Verhoeven and other notable filmmakers.

References

American television writers
American male television writers
St. Xavier High School (Ohio) alumni
University of Chicago alumni
1950 births
2012 deaths